Isabel W.C.E. Arends (born 1966) is a Dutch chemist and professor of biocatalysis and organic chemistry at Utrecht University. She was appointed dean of its Faculty of Science in July 2018. Her research specializes in environmentally-friendly, or 'green', chemistry; for example, using enzymes as biocatalysts while avoiding the need for toxic solvents.

Academic career 
Arends studied physical organic chemistry at Leiden University between 1984 and 1988, obtaining an MsC. In 1993 she obtained her PhD at the same university with a thesis titled: 'Thermolysis of arene derivatives with coal-type hydrogen donors', studying with Prof. Rob Louw and Dr. Peter Mulder. Following graduation, Arends spent a year as a postdoctoral researcher in Ottawa, Canada at the Steacie Institute for Molecular Sciences. She joined Delft University of Technology in 1995, and was awarded a research fellowship of the Royal Netherlands Academy of Arts and Sciences (KNAW) in the field of biomimetic oxidations.  

Between 2001 and 2006 she worked as associate and assistant professor at Delft University of Technology. In 2007 she was promoted to full professor of Biocatalysis and Organic Chemistry. She served as the chair of the Biotechnology Department at Delft University of Technology from 2013 to 2018, vice-chair of the Applied and Engineering Sciences domain of the Netherlands Organisation for Scientific Research, and founded the TU Delft Bioengineering Institute in 2016. 

Arends was elected a member of the Royal Netherlands Academy of Arts and Sciences (KNAW) in 2017.

References

1966 births
Living people
Academic staff of the Delft University of Technology
21st-century Dutch chemists
Dutch women chemists
Leiden University alumni
Members of the Royal Netherlands Academy of Arts and Sciences
Academic staff of Utrecht University